Gasparo Balbi was an Italian jeweller, merchant, and author from Venice, who is best known for his account of his travels to India and the East from 1579 to 1588. He mainly travelled with Portuguese merchant and naval vessels and to forts and trading posts owned by or friendly to that country's commerce. His story, published in 1590 in Venice, was titled Voyage to the Oriental Indies.

Itinerary

His travels began in Cyprus, whence he moved to Aleppo, then to Babylon and Basra, and finally to the Portuguese fort of Hormuz.

From there, he embarked over water past the Portuguese fort of Dibba (Debe), to the post at Diu, from there to Daman and then to the walled city of Chiauul (Chaul), then Goa, then Cocchi, through Cananor (Cannanore) and Onor. He then went to Negapatan (Nagapattinam), then to São Tomé and then to Pegu. He then visited Dala, Dogon and the ruins of Sirian (Syriam), Meccao, and Silon. He went then to Maraban, Malacca. and from there to Cocchi (Kingdom of Cochin). He visited the Portuguese fortress of Colombo in Seilan (Ceylon, now Sri Lanka). He returned via Hormuz, Basra, and Babylon.

Selected observations

He visited the temple of Alefanta (Elephanta Caves) near what is today Bombay, and attributed its construction to Alexander the Great, in the same way later European visitors to the Taj Mahal in past centuries attributed the structure to European visitors. The ships on which he traveled had to fight off corsairs from the Malabar Coast.

There is little analysis or confession in the account; the account is often a dry businessman's succinct observations of places and their contents. As a merchant at heart discussing the mechanics of trade, he details the various exchange rates for coins in Basra, Goa and Negapatan including silver Serafini (Xerafims), Venetian Liri, and Gold Zecchini. He describes how merchants used the abacus for calculations, and their units of measurement. In Cocchi, he was able to see the arrival of a merchant ship from China, and was able to discuss the coins used by merchants in Malacca, and the emperor-sponsored preaching of Christianity by the Jesuits in China.

Near San Thome and other sites in India, he observed on the rites of suttee. In Negapatan he watched the funeral rites for the king, including when women of his harem and some of his subjects willingly threw themselves and died under the wheels of a funeral carriage procession. He also had numerous observations on Hindu rites. He describes people drowning themselves in the Ganges to gain paradise. He claims Brahmin priests in Cochin can exert licentiousness with woman in the province, rich or poor, married or single.

Yet his account, often cursory, seems to stress the barbarity of the place, and his abhorrence of non-Christian religions, often deriding them as devil-worship. He finds as much to fear from man as from animals. He noted frequently the danger from man-eating tigers. In the Andaman islands, they stop off on an island named Carnalcubar, which they say is populated by savage cannibals.

He describes the four white elephants kept by the king of Pegù. He also describes how they catch and domesticate wild elephants. He described their marriage ceremonies, and festivities. He described the harsh physical punishments, including castration, for different immoral offences. He also described that he witnessed the king of Pegu, after a war, put four thousand inhabitants, men, women, and children, of a town to death by fire. He states he watched it with great compassion and my pain, seeing young blameless angels suffer martyrdom. In another anecdote, in 1583, Nadabayin, then king of Pegu, inquired from Balbi, as to who was the king of Venice. Balbi replied, there was no king, and that it is governed as a republic and not dominated by any king, taken by such a great marvel this king, began to laugh in such fashion that he was overcome with coughing and he said it gave him great displeasure (for me) to have such said to great persons like him.

While Marco Polo's travels were, by then, centuries old; Balbi's commentary is generally contemporary with travels by the fellow-Venetian Niccolò de' Conti and Cesare Federici. The Genoese Hieronymo di San Stefano and Varthema of Bologna, occurred at the beginning of the 16th century. The more eloquent tale of Gemelli Careri in Giro del Mondo would be over a century later.

Sources

Explorers of Asia
Explorers from the Republic of Venice
Republic of Venice merchants
Italian travel writers
Italian male non-fiction writers
16th-century Venetian writers
16th-century Italian businesspeople
16th-century male writers
16th-century travel writers